Macromanagement is a style of leadership that is hands-off or from afar, allowing employees to have more freedom and control over their own work, while employers may shift focus to strategic long-term goals.

Contrary to micromanagement where managers closely observe and control the works of their employees, macromanagement is a more independent style of organizational management. Managers step back and give employees the freedom to do their job how they think it is best done, so long as the desired result is reached. Micromanagement also tends to revolve around short-term results, whereas macromanagement puts an emphasis on long-term results.

Both styles of management are viewed as a negative when taken to an extreme, so it is important for organizations to develop a balance of micro- and macromanagement practices and understand when to apply which. 

Downsides to macromanagement include disconnect between managers and employees and a lack of understanding of the roles of employees, both of which can lead to an impression of bureaucracy in a workplace. 

Another interpretation of macromanagement is when an organization views itself as a social institution, orienting its goals and purpose toward serving society. To do this, they align the organization’s values, norms, ethics with those of the society they are immersed in.   

In 1971, Alan Wells defined a social institution as “patterns of rules, customs, norms, beliefs and roles that are instrumentally related to the needs and purposes of society.” Other examples of social institutions in this respect include government and religious organizations, some more in-line with serving society that others.  

This interpretation of macromanagement is less about managing employees, but rather managing the organization from a broader perspective that is oriented toward the future. An organization that practices macromanagement greatly considers the future of the organization, the future of society, and their impact on one another.

References

Bibliography
1. McFarland, Dalton E.(1977). Management, Humanism, and Society: The Case for Macromanagement Theory. Academy of Management. Retrieved 20 October 2017.

Management